Moisés Pereiro Pérez (born 24 February 1980 in Ourense, Galicia) is a Spanish retired footballer who played as a midfielder, and is the manager of At Montañeros

External links

Futbolme profile  

1980 births
Living people
Spanish footballers
Footballers from Ourense
Association football midfielders
Segunda División players
Segunda División B players
Tercera División players
FC Barcelona C players
FC Barcelona Atlètic players
Racing de Ferrol footballers
Zamora CF footballers
CD Ourense footballers
Pontevedra CF footballers
Spain youth international footballers
Spanish football managers